is a public university in Tamamura, Gunma Prefecture, Japan. Established in 1980, it is one of the two public women's universities in Japan, alongside Fukuoka Women's University.

History 
The school was established in 1980 in the city of Maebashi and relocated to Tamamura in 1982. A graduate (doctoral) program was established in 1994.

External links
 Official website 

Educational institutions established in 1980
Public universities in Japan
Universities and colleges in Gunma Prefecture
1980 establishments in Japan
Women's universities and colleges in Japan
Tamamura, Gunma